This article presents the discography of Exodus, an American thrash metal band formed in 1980 in San Francisco, California. The band rose to prominence in the US during the thrash metal era with their first four albums between 1985 and 1990. Over the years, they have released eleven studio albums, three live albums, two compilation albums, three video albums, eleven music videos, and eight singles.

Albums

Studio albums

Live albums

Compilation albums

Singles

Videos

Video albums

Music videos

References 

Heavy metal group discographies
Discographies of American artists